A Gau is an administrative division formerly used in Germany, the plural of which is Gaue (though often rendered in English as Gaus).

Gaus  may refer to:
 Bettina Gaus (1956–2021), German journalist
 Carl Friedrich Gauss (1777–1855), German mathematician and physicist
 Günter Gaus (1929–2004), German journalist
 Katharina Gaus (1972–2021), Australian immunologist 
 Gaus Island, an island in the Camotes Sea in the Philippines